The Hong Kong Massacre is a top-down shooter video game developed and published by Vreski for Microsoft Windows and PlayStation 4 in January 2019, and for Nintendo Switch in December 2020. It is the first game to be developed by the studio. Set in 1990s Hong Kong, the game follows a former police detective as he sets out to exact revenge against the Triad for the death of his partner.

Gameplay
Inspired by classic action movies such as those of John Woo as well as other video games like Hotline Miami and Max Payne, The Hong Kong Massacre is a top-down shooter in which the player character will die by being shot only once. As a balance measure, the game features a number of special abilities, such as a slow-motion system, a dive/dodge which renders the player invincible for a small amount of time as well as weapon upgrades.

The story of the game is told through a series of conversations and cutscenes, with each of the 35 levels serving as a flashback. At the beginning of each level, the player can choose to equip one of four guns available: pistol, rifle, SMG or shotgun. They must then enter the level and kill all enemies inside it in order to progress to the next level. Visually, the game is reminiscent of Hong Kong action films, including locations such as ruined buildings, kitchens, back alleys, rooftops and abandoned restaurants.

Reception

According to review aggregator Metacritic, The Hong Kong Massacre has received "mixed or average reviews".

Although the game was praised for its intense action and for its emulation of classic action movies, it was criticized for the lack of variety in gameplay and challenges and for quickly becoming repetitive.

References

External links

 

2019 video games
Action video games
Neo-noir video games
Nintendo Switch games
Organized crime video games
PlayStation 4 games
Single-player video games
Top-down video games
Video games about revenge
Video games developed in Sweden
Video games set in 1992
Video games set in Hong Kong
Windows games